Cook's Country is an American half-hour television cooking show on the PBS public broadcasting channel. The show is based on Cook's Country magazine (published by the same company as Cook's Illustrated).

Cast 
The structure of Cook's Country is similar to sister show America's Test Kitchen, with many of the same cast. Bridget Lancaster and Julia Collin Davison host the show. Jack Bishop is in charge of the Tasting Lab, while Adam Ried features new products in the Equipment Corner.

Julia Collin Davison did not appear during season 2. She returned in season 3.

Christopher Kimball hosted the show for the first nine seasons. During season 1, Kimball's neighbor Axel Blomberg occasionally appeared on-screen with a dish of the featured recipe, exhibiting how the recipe could be badly executed.

On November 16, 2015, a news release from Boston Commons Press, parent company of Cooks Country, Cooks Illustrated, and America's Test Kitchen, announced the departure of Christopher Kimball over a contract dispute. Season 9's TV programs had already been filmed with Kimball as the host, but he would not appear on any future episodes.

Due to the departure of Christopher Kimball, Bridget Lancaster and Julia Collin Davison began hosting Cook's Country in season 10. Also in season 10, America's Test Kitchen staff members Ashley Moore, Christie Morrison, and Bryan Roof were added to the cast, while Erin McMurrer, having moved to the America's Test Kitchen cast, is no longer seen on air on Cook's Country (but remains credited as a behind-the-scenes crew member).

Season 11 added Lan Lam to the Cast. New staff members Lawman Johnson and Natalie Estrada were added in season 12, while Lan Lam is no longer seen on Cook's Country. Season 13 added Morgan Bolling to the Cast, replacing Natalie Estrada. Ashley Moore was to not appear in season 13, but was to return for season 14. 

Toni Tipton-Martin joined as Editor-in-Chief in season 14, giving a history lesson on each episode's primary recipe or ingredient.  She began introducing the show in season 15.

Episodes 

In contrast to its predecessor, Cook's Country focuses on regional recipes across the United States. The hosts begins each segment with a historical perspective on each recipe prior to the demonstration.

Seasons 1-10 were recorded on location at a farmhouse in Rupert, Vermont. Beginning in season 11, taping and production were moved to a purpose-built farmhouse studio set at America's Test Kitchen headquarters in Boston, Massachusetts. The Tasting Lab segments are filmed before a live studio audience.

The theme music for seasons 1-11, "Right Between Your Eyes", is performed by the San Francisco bluegrass band Hot Buttered Rum. As of season 12, the theme music is instrumental.

Awards

References

External links
Official Website

PBS original programming
2000s American cooking television series
2010s American cooking television series
2008 American television series debuts